Smārde (German: Schmarden) is a village in and center of Engure municipality, Latvia.

In 1877, it was one of the 10 towns where more railway stations were opened.

References 

Towns and villages in Latvia